A Day Will Come is a 1950 West German historical drama film directed by Rudolf Jugert and starring Dieter Borsche, Maria Schell and Lil Dagover. It was shot at the Göttingen Studios. The film's sets were designed by the art director Walter Haag. It is based on Ernst Penzoldt's novella Korporal Mombour, set at the time of the Franco-Prussian War.

Cast
Dieter Borsche as Friedrich
Maria Schell as Madeleine
Lil Dagover as Mme. Mombour
Gustav Knuth as Paul
Renate Mannhardt as Louise
Else Ehser as Lisette
Herbert Hübner as Monsieur Mombour
Alfred Schieske as Oberst Schedy
Gerd Martienzen as Duvernoy
Wilhelm Meyer-Ottens as staff surgeon
Ernst Legal as mayor
Hans Mahnke as Poussin, carpenter
Norbert Zeuner as Baptiste

References

External links

1950s historical drama films
German historical drama films
1950s war drama films
German war drama films
West German films
Films directed by Rudolf Jugert
Films set in the 1870s
Franco-Prussian War films
Films based on German novels
1950 drama films
German black-and-white films
1950s German films
Films shot at Göttingen Studios